Siranush is a given name of Armenian origin. People with this given name include:

 Siranush (1857–1932), also known as Merope Sahaki Kantarjian, Ottoman Empire-born Armenian actress 
 Siranush Andriasian (born 1986), Armenian chess International master
 Siranush Atoyan (1904–1985), Soviet Armenian architect
 Siranush Gasparyan (born 1978), Armenian dramatic soprano
 Siranush Ghukasyan (born 1998), Armenian chess player
 Siranush Harutyunyan (born 1987), known professionally as Sirusho, Armenian singer and songwriter

Armenian given names